Fesenkov is a lunar impact crater on the far side of the Moon. It is located to the east-southeast of the prominent crater Tsiolkovskiy, and less than a crater diameter to the north of Stark.

This is an eroded feature with an outer rim that has been irregular and somewhat rugged due to a history of lesser bombardments in the vicinity. The interior floor is somewhat uneven, particularly in the eastern half, and there is a central rise at the midpoint. From the outer northeastern rim is a chain of tiny secondary impacts leading to the east, radial to the Tsiolkovsky impact.

Satellite craters
By convention these features are identified on lunar maps by placing the letter on the side of the crater midpoint that is closest to Fesenkov.

References

 
 
 
 
 
 
 
 
 
 
 
 

Impact craters on the Moon